Thompson v. Hebdon, 589 U.S. ___ (2019), is a United States Supreme Court decision concerning campaign finance. The Ninth Circuit's decision was vacated and remanded by the Supreme Court.

Background
The Supreme Court was asked to review the Ninth' Circuit's decision upholding Alaska's restrictions on campaign finance after the Cato Institute petitioned to the Supreme Court to reverse the Ninth Circuit. Alaska's limit on campaign contributions was $500 per year to an individual candidate and $1,000 per year to a political group.

Decision
The Court issued its decision on November 25, 2019, vacating and remanding the Ninth Circuit's decision for further review.

Reactions

Although the Supreme Court again ruled against campaign finance regulations in this decision, the court avoided making a sweeping decision which would have called into question other donation limits in other states. Therefore, UC Irvine election law professor Richard L. Hasen said that this was the "least bad way" campaign finance reform groups could have lost this case.

According to Jason Torchinsky, a campaign finance lawyer working in one of the GOP's most prominent law firms, the decision shows that a majority of Justices do not agree with low campaign donation limits, but might be hesitant to take on this fight in today's political climate.

Statement by Ginsburg
Justice Ruth Bader Ginsburg filed a statement respecting the Supreme Court's decision vacating and remanding the ruling of the Ninth Circuit. Ginsburg's statement notes that campaign finance limits regarding political parties in Alaska are more lenient than the limits on contributions to individual donors, unlike the laws in Vermont. Ginsburg expressed concern that Alaska is prone to be influenced excessively by the fossil fuel industry because it is a sparsely populated state that receives much of its revenue from the fossil fuel industry.

References

External links
 

Campaign finance in the United States
United States elections case law
United States Free Speech Clause case law
United States Supreme Court cases
United States Supreme Court cases of the Roberts Court
2019 in United States case law
Political history of Alaska